Rosemary Jenkinson (born 7 September 1967) is an Irish poet, playwright, and short story writer.

Biography 
Rosemary Jenkinson was born in Belfast, Northern Ireland, in 1967 and is a self-proclaimed "ex-civil servant". Her parents, James and Denise Jenkinson, encouraged Jenkinson to be creative and well-traveled. While at Durham University, Jenkinson studied Medieval Literature. Jenkinson was a teacher of English during her travels to Greece, Poland, France, and the Czech Republic before returning to live in Belfast in 2002. Jenkinson's plays have been performed in New York, Washington DC, Dublin, Edinburgh, and Belfast. Her play The Bonefire was commissioned by the Rough Magic's Seed Project in 2004. The Bonefire was produced at the Dublin Theatre Festival and won the Stewart Parker BBC Radio Drama Award.

Works

Short stories 
 Contemporary Problems Nos. 53 & 54 (Lagan Press, 2004)
 Aphrodite's Kiss (Whittick Press, 2016)
 Catholic Boy (Doire Press, 2018)
 Lifestyle Choice 10mgs (Doire Press, 2020)
 Marching Season (Arlen House, 2021) Love in the Time of Chaos (Arlen House, 2023)
 Plays 
 The Bonefire (2006)
 The Winners (2008)
 Bruised (2008)
 Johnny Meister + the Stitch (2008)
 The Lemon Tree (2009)
 Stella Morgan (2010)
 1 in 5 (2011)
 Basra Boy (2012)
 Cuchullain (2012)
 White Star of the North (2012)
 Planet Belfast (2013)
 A Midsummer Night's Riot (2014)
 The Dealer of Ballynafeigh (2015)
 Stitched Up (2015)
 Here Comes The Night (2016)
 Love or Money (2016)
 Michelle and Arlene (2017)
 Lives in Translation (2017)
 May the Road Rise Up (2018)
 I Shall Wear Purple (2019)
 Dream, Sleep, Connect (2020)
 Billy Boy (2021)
 Silent Trade (2023)
 Awards 
 The Sunday Tribune's'' Hennessy Award for New Irish Writing
 Asham Prize
 Brian Moore Short Story Award
 Black Hill Books Short Story Competition
 Stewart Parker BBC Radio Drama Award
 Northern Short Story Competition
 ACNI Major Artist Award
 EU Prize for Literature (shortlist)
 Edge Hill Short Story Prize (shortlist)

References

External links 
 Rosemary Jenkinson: banter and booze -- you can't write about Belfast without them

Interviews 
 Friday People: Rosemary Jenkinson

1967 births
Living people
Women dramatists and playwrights from Northern Ireland
Women short story writers from Northern Ireland
21st-century women writers from Northern Ireland
21st-century dramatists and playwrights from Northern Ireland
21st-century Irish short story writers
Alumni of the College of St Hild and St Bede, Durham
21st-century British short story writers